The 1990 Campeonato Brasileiro Série B was the second division of Brazilian football, played by 24 teams. It began in August 1990 and ended on December 6, 1990. The Sport Recife became champion of this tournament.

Format
First Phase
The 24 participants were divided into four groups of six teams each. The teams competed in round within groups and robin, qualifying to the next stage the top four of each shift. The four teams with the worst campaigns would be relegated to 1991 Série C, but no such tournament happened, as CBF decided to include 64 clubs in the 1991 Série B, and cancel the Série C of that year.
Second Phase
The 16 qualified teams were divided into four groups with four teams each, playing in the group in turn and robin, qualifying the top two from each group to the next stage.
Third Phase
The 8 qualified teams were divided into two groups of four teams each, playing in the group in turn and robin, qualifying the best of each group for the final.
Final
Both teams champions group of stage disputed the title in two matches. Both gained access to the 1991 Campeonato Brasileiro Série A.

First phase

Group A

Group B

Group C

Group D

Second phase

Third phase

Final

Sport declared as the Campeonato Brasileiro Série B champions due to better season record.

Promotion
The champion and the runner-up, which are Sport and Atlético Paranaense, were promoted to the following year's first level.

Relegation
The four worst placed teams, which are Anapolina, Coritiba, Americano and Treze, were relegated to the following year's third level. However, the Second level was expanded to 64 clubs in the next year, eliminating any need for a Third level, and thus the relegations were cancelled.

Champion

Campeonato Brasileiro Série B seasons
2